Mount Mellum is a rural locality in the Sunshine Coast Region, Queensland, Australia.

Geography

History 
Prior to occupation by European colonists in the 19th century, Mount Mellum, along with the rest of the modern Sunshine Coast Region was under the custodianship of the Gubbi Gubbi aboriginal nation.

Mount Mellum State School opened in 1920 and closed in 1926. It reopened in 1930 and then closed permanently circa 1938.

Education 
There are no schools in Mount Mellum. The nearest primary school is Landsborough State School in neighbouring Landsborough to the north-east. The nearest secondary school is Beerwah State High School in neighbouring Beerwah to the south-east.

References 

Suburbs of the Sunshine Coast Region
Localities in Queensland